The BYD D1 is a purpose-built electric compact multi purpose vehicle (MPV) developed by BYD in cooperation with DiDi exclusively developed for ride-hailing services.

History 
As of 2018, Didi formed an alliance with automakers including Volkswagen, BAIC, and BYD to develop purpose-built intelligent vehicles for ride-hailing and fleet management. The alliance starts with DiDi offering its customer base and operational skills to automakers wanting to develop their own ride-hailing services as research database in return for design expertise. The D1 model is the first purpose-built model DiDi has unveiled for ride-hailing services that came out of the alliance with automakers. 

As of August 2020, Government documents show that BYD received approval from the Ministry of Industry and Information Technology of China to sell an electric vehicle developed with DiDi called the D1.  

On November 16, 2020, the BYD D1 was revealed in Beijing. The firm announced that the vehicle would start to join the ride hailing service as part of the test run in December in Changsha. Sales were limited to drivers registered on the ride hailing platform at launch. According to officials, the D1 name means "Always Day 1".

Specifications 

The D1 features a sliding door on the right side to free passengers from opening the door and potentially hitting cyclists or pedestrians. The vehicles also has larger legroom for back seat passengers.

Sales 
Didi plans to put 10,000 D1 units in service from October 2020 to December 2020, and 100,000 units in 2021. As the first model to have been built with ride-hailing in mind, DiDi plans to ship D1 vehicles to leasing partners across several Chinese cities.

References

External links 
 Official website (in Chinese)

BYD vehicles
Minivans
Front-wheel-drive vehicles
Cars of China
Taxi vehicles
Electric taxis
Cars introduced in 2020